WOAB (104.9 FM) is a radio station licensed to serve Ozark, Alabama, United States.  The station, which first signed on in 1967, is owned by Fred Dockins, through licensee Dockins Communications, Inc.

WOAB broadcasts a country music format.

History
WOAB signed on the air on July 9, 1967, with 2,850 watts of effective radiated power on 104.9 MHz.  Owned by the Ozark Broadcasting Company, this new FM station signed on as a separately-programmed sister station to WOZK (900 AM).  The station aired a primarily country music format through the 1970s.

Effective July 7, 2021, Ozark Broadcasting sold WOAB, WOZK, and the construction permit for translator W252DV to Fred Dockins' Dockins Communications for $125,000.

On February 23, 2022 WOAB changed formats from oldies to country, branded as "Kickin' Country 104.9".

Previous logo

References

External links

OAB
Country radio stations in the United States
Radio stations established in 1967
Dale County, Alabama